Zhang Geng (born 9 March 1980) is a Chinese team handball player. Playing on the Chinese national team, she competed at the 2008 Summer Olympics in Beijing, where China placed sixth.

References

External links

1980 births
Living people
Chinese female handball players
Olympic handball players of China
Handball players at the 2008 Summer Olympics
Handball players at the 1998 Asian Games
Asian Games competitors for China